Marit Tingelstad (born 18 June 1938 in Lier) is a Norwegian politician for the Centre Party.

She was elected to the Norwegian Parliament from Oppland in 1993, and was re-elected on one occasion. She had previously served in the position of deputy representative during the term 1989–1993.

Tingelstad was a member of Gran municipality council during the term 1975–1979, and of Oppland county council during the term 1987–1991.

References

1938 births
Living people
Members of the Storting
Women members of the Storting
Centre Party (Norway) politicians
21st-century Norwegian politicians
21st-century Norwegian women politicians
20th-century Norwegian politicians
20th-century Norwegian women politicians